The 1931 Pacific Tigers football team represented the College of the Pacific—now known as the University of the Pacific—in Stockton, California as a member of the Far Western Conference (FWC) during the 1931 college football season. The team was led by 11th-year head coach Erwin Righter, and played home games at Baxter Stadium in Stockton. Pacific compiled an overall record of 5–2–2 with a mark of 2–1–2 in conference play, placing in a four-way tie for first in the FWC. No champion was named for the 1931 season. The Tigers outscored their opponents 110 to 52 for the season.

Schedule

References

Pacific
Pacific Tigers football seasons
Pacific Tigers football